Gintaras Šurkus (born 13 August 1953) is a Lithuanian balloonist and politician.

In 1999, Šurkus won bronze in World Hot Air Ballooning Championships. In 2003 and 2011 was elected to Alytus council.

References

1953 births
Living people
Lithuanian balloonists
Soviet balloonists